Jaílson may refer to:

 Jaílson Araújo (born 1991), Brazilian football right back
 Jailson Severiano Alves (born 1984), Brazilian football midfielder
 Jailson Marcelino dos Santos (born 1981), Brazilian football goalkeeper
 Jaílson França Braz, known as Bia (born 1981), Brazilian football midfielder
 Jailson Siqueira (born 1995), Brazilian football midfielder
 Jaílson Alexandre Alves dos Santos (1981), Brazilian football midfielder
 Jailson (footballer, born 1992), Edjailson Nascimento da Silva, Brazilian football attacking midfielder